The 1960 Soviet football championship was the 28th seasons of competitive football in the Soviet Union and the 22nd among teams of sports societies and factories. Torpedo Moscow won the championship becoming the Soviet domestic champions for the first time.

Honours

Notes = Number in parentheses is the times that club has won that honour. * indicates new record for competition

Soviet Union football championship

Class A (second stage)

Places 1–6

Places 7–12

Places 13–18

Places 19–22

Promotion/relegation play-off
 [Nov 3, 6]
 Shakhtyor Stalino     2-0 0-1 Metallurg Zaporozhye

Class B

Russian Federation finals
 [Oct 25 – Nov 5, Shakhty]

Ukraine finals
 [Oct 28, 30, Kiev]
 Metallurg Zaporozhye  6-2 0-0 Sudostroitel Nikolayev

Union republics finals
 [Oct 30, Nov 5] 
 Torpedo Kutaisi  2-0 0-1 Lokomotiv Tbilisi

Top goalscorers

Class A
Zaur Kaloyev (Dinamo Tbilisi) – 20 goals

References

External links
 1960 Soviet football championship. RSSSF